Jessica Michelle Kahawaty (born 12 September 1988 in Sydney, New South Wales) is a Lebanese Australian model, philanthropist, former TV Host and beauty pageant titleholder who won Miss World Australia 2012  and represented Australia at Miss World 2012 in Ordos City, Inner Mongolia, China where she claimed second runner-up.

Career
She also studied Law and Business Finance. She competed in Miss Lebanon 2010 held at the LBC studios in Adma, Lebanon, where she was rewarded the position of third runner-up.

Jessica won her first beauty pageant at the age of 17 years in Sydney, Australia in May 2007. She was crowned Miss Lebanon Australia 2007 and was the first Lebanese Australian to subsequently win Miss Lebanon World 2008 in the following year. The pageant, held in Batroun Village Club, Lebanon, on 14 August 2008 featured 31 contestants of Lebanese origin from around the world. In November, she represented Lebanon in Miss International 2008, where she placed in the Top 12.

Jessica has studied a combined degree of Bachelor of Laws and Business with a major in Finance in Sydney. In her acting career, she has filmed various commercials for known brands such as Maybelline Cosmetics for India and Lexus cars for Australia. She has also been featured in major catwalks, magazines, and photoshoots around the world.

While focusing on her career, Kahawaty also aids in community service and conducts her own charity events. In 2007, she raised money for charities in both Australia and Lebanon, most notably Lilla community and Charity: Water.

Honours

Domestic beauty pageants
 Miss World Australia 2012: Winner
 Miss Lebanon 2010: 3rd Runner-Up
 Miss Lebanon Australia 2007: Winner

International beauty pageants
 Miss World 2012: 2nd Runner-Up (representing Australia)
 Miss International 2008: Top 12 (representing Lebanon)
 Miss Lebanon Emigrant 2008: Winner (representing Australia)

References

External links

 MEProjectRunway
 Jessica Kahawaty
 Contestant Profile on MissWorld.com
 Jessica Kahawaty on Instagram
 Jessica Kahawaty on Facebook
 Jessica Kahawaty on Twitter

1988 births
Living people
Models from Sydney
Australian people of Lebanese descent
Australian beauty pageant winners
Australian female models
Australian bloggers
Australian expatriates in the United Arab Emirates
Australian food industry businesspeople
Australian humanitarians
Australian women bloggers
Miss International 2008 delegates
Miss World 2012 delegates
University of Technology Sydney alumni
Women humanitarians
21st-century Australian businesspeople
21st-century Australian businesswomen